The Chisholm Trail Museum in Wellington, Kansas is a museum that celebrates the Chisholm Trail. The Museum was formed in 1963 by a group of Wellington citizens. In 1965, the Hatcher Hospital Building was donated to the museum.

It includes artifacts of local domestic life.

There are other museums dedicated to the Chisholm Trail in Duncan, Oklahoma (the Chisholm Trail Heritage Center), in Waurika, Oklahoma (the Chisholm Trail Historical Museum), in Kingfisher, Oklahoma (also named Chisolm Trail Museum, in Cleburne, Texas, and in Cuero, Texas.

References

Museums in Sumner Country, Kansas
Chisholm Trail